Steward Creek is a stream in Freeborn County, in the U.S. state of Minnesota. It was named for Hiram J. Steward, an early settler.

See also
List of rivers of Minnesota

References

Rivers of Freeborn County, Minnesota
Rivers of Minnesota